Problem management is the process responsible for managing the lifecycle of all problems that happen or could happen in an IT service. The primary objectives of problem management are to prevent problems and resulting incidents from happening, to eliminate recurring incidents, and to minimize the impact of incidents that cannot be prevented. ITIL defines a problem as the cause of one or more incidents.

See also

 ISO/IEC 15504
Quality Assurance
RPR Problem Diagnosis
 Grey problem
 Pareto analysis

References

 The New Rational Manager - Describes KT Problem Solving and Decision Making (PSDM)
 

ITIL
Problem solving